Ravenswood is a small town in the Peel region of Western Australia.

The town is located along Pinjarra Road and on the banks of the Murray River.

History 
The town retains the name it was given as a property established by Adam Armstrong in the 1840s; Armstrong was one of the settlers who arrived with Thomas Peel on Gilmore in 1829. The area was sub-divided in the 1960s and the shire requested that a townsite be declared.
The town was gazetted in 1970.

Population and demographics 
In the 2016 Australian census, the total population of Ravenswood was 2,176 people; 49.17 percent were male and 50.83 percent were female. 69.21% of people were born in Australia. The second most common country of birth was England at 10.71%. 89.06% of people only spoke English at home. Christianity was the most common religious affiliation recorded at 53.49% while 34.19% of persons stated no religious affiliation. The median age of persons living in Ravenswood was 43. Of persons aged 15 years and over, 53.14% were married, 27.42% never married, 5.44% widowed, 9.8% divorced, and 4.25% separated.

The median total weekly household income was A$1,093.

References 

Shire of Murray